The 2024 FIFA U-17 Women's World Cup will be the 8th edition of the FIFA U-17 Women's World Cup, the multinational–international women's youth football championship, contested by the under-17 national teams of the member associations of FIFA, since its inception in 2008. The host country and dates of the tournament are yet to be confirmed.

Spain are the defending champions, having won their second title in 2022.

Host selection

AFC

 Japan
 Korea Republic 

CAF

 Nigeria

CONCACAF

 Mexico
 United States of America 

UEFA

 Germany

Qualified teams

References

2024 in women's association football
2024 in youth association football
Scheduled association football competitions